In mathematics, -equivalence, sometimes called right-left equivalence, is an equivalence relation between map germs.

Let   and  be two manifolds, and let  be two smooth map germs.

In other words, two map germs are -equivalent if one can be taken onto the other by a diffeomorphic change of co-ordinates in the source (i.e. ) and the target (i.e. ).

Let  denote the space of smooth map germs  Let  be the group of diffeomorphism germs  and 
(or vice versa).

Since  is an infinite dimensional space metric topology is no longer trivial. Whitney topology compares the differences in successive derivatives and gives a notion of proximity within the infinite dimensional space. A base for the open sets of the topology in question is given by taking -jets for every  and taking open neighbourhoods in the ordinary Euclidean sense. Open sets in the topology are then unions of
these base sets.

Consider the orbit of some map germ  The map germ  is called simple if there are only finitely many other orbits in a neighbourhood of each of its points.

See also
 K-equivalence (contact equivalence)

References
 M. Golubitsky and V. Guillemin, Stable Mappings and Their Singularities. Graduate Texts in Mathematics, Springer.

Functions and mappings
Singularity theory
Equivalence (mathematics)